The following is an alphabetical list of living brachiopod species and genera.

List
 Abyssorhynchia (1 species)
 Abyssorhynchia craneana
 Abyssothyris (1 species)
 Abyssothyris briggsi
 Abyssothyris wyvillei
 Acanthobasiliola (1 species)
 Acanthobasiliola doederleini
 Acrobelesia (1 species)
 Acrobelesia cooperi
 Acrobrochus (3 species)
 Acrobrochus blochmanni
 Acrobrochus marotiriensis
 Acrobrochus vema
 Aerothyris (2 species)
 Aerothyris kerguelensis
 Aerothyris macquariensis
 Agulhasia (2 species)
 Agulhasia davidsoni
 Agulhasia densicostata
 Amphithyris (7 species)
 Amphithyris buckmani
 Amphithyris cavernicola
 Amphithyris comitodensis
 Amphithyris hallenttensis
 Amphithyris parva
 Amphithyris richardsonae
 Amphithyris seminula
 Anakinetica (1 species)
 Anakinetica cumingii
 Aneboconcha (3 species)
 Aneboconcha eichleri
 Aneboconcha obscura
 Aneboconcha smithii
 Annuloplatidia (5 species)
 Annuloplatidia annulata
 Annuloplatidia curiosa
 Annuloplatidia horni
 Annuloplatidia indopacifica
 Annuloplatidia richeri
 Arctosia (1 species) [fossil per IRMNG]
 Arctosia arctica
 Argyrotheca (21 species)
 Argyrotheca angulata
 Argyrotheca australis
 Argyrotheca barrettiana
 Argyrotheca bermudana
 Argyrotheca cistellula
 Argyrotheca crassa
 Argyrotheca cuneata
 Argyrotheca furtiva
 Argyrotheca grandicostata
 Argyrotheca hewatti
 Argyrotheca jacksoni
 Argyrotheca johnsoni
 Argyrotheca lowei
 Argyrotheca lutea
 Argyrotheca neocaledonensis
 Argyrotheca rubrocostata
 Argyrotheca rubrotincta
 Argyrotheca schrammi
 Argyrotheca somaliensis
 Argyrotheca thurmanni
 Argyrotheca woodwardiana
 Aulites (2 species)
 Aulites brazieri
 Aulites crosnieri
 Basiliola (5 species)
 Basiliola arnaudi
 Basiliola beecheri
 Basiliola elongata
 Basiliola lucida
 Basiliola pompholyx
 Basiliolella (2 species)
 Basiliolella colurnus
 Basiliolella grayi
 Bathynanus (4 species)
 Bathynanus dalli
 Bathynanus inversus
 Bathynanus rhizopodus
 Bathynanus tenuicostatus
 Bouchardia (1 species) [fossil per IRMNG]
 Bouchardia rosea
 Calloria (2 species)
 Calloria inconspicua
 Calloria variegata
 Campages (8 species)
 Campages asthenia
 Campages dubius
 Campages furcifera
 Campages japonica
 Campages mariae
 Campages nipponensis
 Campages ovalis
 Campages pacifica
 Cancellothyris (1 species)
 Cancellothyris hedleyi
 Chlidonophora (2 species)
 Chlidonophora chuni
 Chlidonophora incerta
 Cnismatocentrum (2 species)
 Cnismatocentrum parvum
 Cnismatocentrum sakhalinensis
 Compsothyris (2 species)
 Compsothyris ballenyi
 Compsothyris racovitzae
 Coptothyris (1 species)
 Coptothyris grayii
 Cryptopora (7 species)
 Cryptopora boettgeri
 Cryptopora curiosa
 Cryptopora gnomon
 Cryptopora hesperis
 Cryptopora maldiviensis
 Cryptopora norfolkensis
 Cryptopora rectimarginata
 Dallina (9 species)
 Dallina elongata
 Dallina eltanini
 Dallina floridana
 Dallina obessa
 Dallina parva
 Dallina profundis
 Dallina raphaelis
 Dallina septigera
 Dallina triangularis
 Dallinella (1 species)
 Dallinella obsoleta
 Dallithyris (5 species)
 Dallithyris dubia
 Dallithyris fulva
 Dallithyris murrayi
 Dallithyris pacifica
 Dallithyris tahitiensis
 Diestothyris (2 species)
 Diestothyris frontalis
 Diestothyris tisimania
 Discina (1 species)
 Discina striata
 Discinisca (5 species)
 Discinisca laevis
 Discinisca lamellosa
 Discinisca lamellosa sensu d'Hondt, 1976
 Discinisca rikuzenensis
 Discinisca tenuis
 Discradisca (6 species)
 Discradisca antillarum
 Discradisca cumingii
 Discradisca indica
 Discradisca sparselineata
 Discradisca stella
 Discradisca strigata
 Dolichozygus (1 species)
 Dolichozygus stearnsii
 Dyscolia (4 species)
 Dyscolia johannisdavisi
 Dyscolia radiata
 Dyscolia subquadrata
 Dyscolia wyvillei
 Dyscritosia (1 species) [fossil per IRMNG]
 Dyscritosia secreta
 Dysedrosia (1 species) [fossil per IRMNG]
 Dysedrosia borneoensis
 Ebiscothyris (1 species)
 Ebiscothyris bellonensis
 Ecnomiosa (2 species)
 Ecnomiosa gerda
 Ecnomiosa inexpectata
 Erymnia (2 species)
 Erymnia angustata
 Erymnia muralifera
 Eucalathis (13 species)
 Eucalathis cubensis
 Eucalathis daphneae
 Eucalathis ergastica
 Eucalathis fasciculata
 Eucalathis floridensis
 Eucalathis inflata
 Eucalathis macrorhynchus
 Eucalathis magma
 Eucalathis malgachensis
 Eucalathis murrayi
 Eucalathis rugosa
 Eucalathis trigona
 Eucalathis tuberata
 Fallax (3 species)
 Fallax antarcticus
 Fallax dalliniformis
 Fallax neocaledonensis
 Fosteria (1 species)
 Fosteria spinosa
 Frenulina (3 species)
 Frenulina cruenta
 Frenulina mauiensis
 Frenulina sanguinolenta
 Frieleia (2 species)
 Frieleia halli
 Frieleia pellucida
 Glaciarcula (2 species)
 Glaciarcula frieli
 Glaciarcula spitzbergensis
 Glottidia (5 species)
 Glottidia albida
 Glottidia audebarti
 Glottidia palmeri
 Glottidia pyramidata
 Glottidia semen
 Goniobrochus (1 species) [fossil per IRMNG]
 Goniobrochus ewingi
 Grammetaria (3 species)
 Grammetaria africana
 Grammetaria bartschi
 Grammetaria minuta
 Gryphus (4 species)
 Gryphus capensis
 Gryphus clarkeana
 Gryphus tokionis
 Gryphus vitreus
 Gwynia (2 species)
 Gwynia capsula
 Gwynia macrodentata
 Gyrothyris (2 species)
 Gyrothyris mawsoni
 Gyrothyris williamsi
 Hemithiris (2 species)
 Hemithiris psittacea
 Hemithiris woodwardi
 Hillerella (1 species)
 Hillerella bisepta
 Hispanirhynchia (1 species)
 Hispanirhynchia cornea
 Holobrachia (1 species)
 Holobrachia vietnamica
 Jaffaia (1 species)
 Jaffaia jaffaensis
 Joania (3 species)
 Joania arguta
 Joania cordata
 Joania mayi
 Jolonica (4 species)
 Jolonica alcocki
 Jolonica hedleyi
 Jolonica nipponica
 Jolonica suffusa
 Kakanuiella (1 species)
 Kakanuiella chathamensis
 Kanakythyris (1 species)
 Kanakythyris pachyrhynchos
 Kraussina (5 species)
 Kraussina cognata
 Kraussina crassicostata
 Kraussina gardineri
 Kraussina mercatori
 Kraussina rubra
 Lacazella (4 species)
 Lacazella australis
 Lacazella caribbeanensis
 Lacazella mauritiana
 Lacazella mediterranea
 Laqueus (13 species)
 Laqueus blanfordi
 Laqueus concentricus
 Laqueus erythraeus
 Laqueus j jeffreysi
 Laqueus morsei
 Laqueus orbicularis
 Laqueus pacifica
 Laqueus pallidus
 Laqueus proprius
 Laqueus quadratus
 Laqueus rubellus
 Laqueus suffusus
 Laqueus vancouveriensis
 Lenticellaria (2 species)
 Lenticellaria gregoryi
 Lenticellaria marerubris
 Leptothyrella (3 species)
 Leptothyrella fijiensis
 Leptothyrella ignota
 Leptothyrella incerta
 Lingula (7 species)
 Lingula adamsi
 Lingula anatina
 Lingula parva
 Lingula reevei
 Lingula rostrum
 Lingula translucida
 Lingula tumidula
 Liothyrella (5 species)
 Liothyrella delsolari
 Liothyrella moseleyi
 Liothyrella neozelanica
 Liothyrella uva
 Liothyrella winteri
 Macandrevi diamantina
 Macandrevia (7 species)
 Macandrevia africana
 Macandrevia americana
 Macandrevia bayeri
 Macandrevia cranium
 Macandrevia emigi
 Macandrevia tenera
 Magadinella (1 species)
 Magadinella mineuri
 Magellania (4 species)
 Magellania flavescens
 Magellania fragilis
 Magellania joubini
 Magellania venosa
 Manithyris (1 species)
 Manithyris rossi
 Megathiris (2 species)
 Megathiris capensis
 Megathiris detruncata
 Megerella (1 species)
 Megerella hilleri
 Megerlia (3 species)
 Megerlia acrura
 Megerlia granosa
 Megerlia truncata
 Megerlina (7 species)
 Megerlina atkinsoni
 Megerlina capensis
 Megerlina davidsoni
 Megerlina lamarckiana
 Megerlina natalensis
 Megerlina pisum
 Megerlina striata
 Melvicalathis (1 species)
 Melvicalathis macroctena
 Minutella (3 species) [fossil per IRMNG]
 Minutella bruntoni
 Minutella minuta
 Minutella tristani
 Murravia (1 species)
 Murravia exarata
 Nanacalathis (2 species)
 Nanacalathis atlantica
 Nanacalathis minuta
 Neoaemula (1 species) [fossil per IRMNG]
 Neoaemula vector
 Neoancistrocrania (1 species)
 Neoancistrocrania norfolki
 Neorhynchia (1 species)
 Neorhynchia strebeli
 Neothyris (3 species)
 Neothyris lenticularis
 Neothyris ovalis
 Neothyris westpacifica
 Nipponithyris (3 species)
 Nipponithyris afra
 Nipponithyris lauensis
 Nipponithyris nipponensis
 Notosaria (2 species)
 Notosaria nigricans
 Notosaria reinga
 Notozyga (2 species)
 Notozyga gracilis
 Notozyga lowenstami
 Novocrania (9 species)
 Novocrania altivertex
 Novocrania anomala
 Novocrania chathamensis ?
 Novocrania huttoni
 Novocrania indonesiensis
 Novocrania lecointei
 Novocrania philippinensis
 Novocrania roseoradiata
 Novocrania turbinata
 Oceanithyris (1 species)
 Oceanithyris juveniformis
 Ospreyella (5 species)
 Ospreyella depressa
 Ospreyella maldiviana
 Ospreyella mutiara
 Ospreyella palauensis
 Pajaudina (1 species) [fossil per IRMNG]
 Pajaudina atlantica
 Parakinetica (1 species)
 Parakinetica stewartii
 Parasphenarina (2 species)
 Parasphenarina cavernicola
 Parasphenarina ezogremena
 Pelagodiscus (1 species)
 Pelagodiscus atlanticus
 Pemphixina (1 species)
 Pemphixina pyxidata
 Phaneropora (1 species)
 Phaneropora galatheae
 Pictothyris (3 species)
 Pictothyris elegans
 Pictothyris laquaeformis
 Pictothyris picta
 Pirothyris (1 species)
 Pirothyris vercoi
 Platidia (2 species)
 Platidia anomioides
 Platidia clepsidra
 Pumilus (1 species)
 Pumilus antiquatus
 Rectocalathis (1 species)
 Rectocalathis schemmgregoryi
 Rhytirhynchia (1 species)
 Rhytirhynchia sladeni
 Septicollarina zezinae
 Septicollarina (3 species)
 Septicollarina hemiechinata
 Septicollarina oceanica
 Shimodaia (2 species)
 Shimodaia macclesfieldensis
 Shimodaia pterygiota
 Simpliciforma (1 species)
 Simpliciforma profunda
 Simplicithyris (2 species)
 Simplicithyris japonica
 Simplicithyris kurilensis
 Stenosarina (9 species)
 Stenosarina angustata
 Stenosarina crosnieri
 Stenosarina davidsoni = sphenoidea
 Stenosarina globosa
 Stenosarina lata
 Stenosarina nitens
 Stenosarina oregonae
 Stenosarina parva
 Stenosarina sphenoidea
 Striarina (1 species)
 Striarina valdiviae
 Surugathyris (1 species)
 Surugathyris surugaensis
 Syntomaria (1 species)
 Syntomaria curiosa
 Terebratalia (4 species)
 Terebratalia coreanica
 Terebratalia gouldi
 Terebratalia transversa
 Terebratalia xanthica
 Terebratella (5 species)
 Terebratella crenulata
 Terebratella dorsata
 Terebratella labradorensis
 Terebratella sanguinea
 Terebratella tenuis
 Terebratulina (26 species)
 Terebratulina abyssicola
 Terebratulina australis
 Terebratulina austroamericana
 Terebratulina cailleti
 Terebratulina callinome
 Terebratulina cavata
 Terebratulina compressa
 Terebratulina crossei
 Terebratulina cumingii
 Terebratulina hataiana
 Terebratulina hawaiiensis
 Terebratulina japonica
 Terebratulina kiiensis
 Terebratulina kitakamiensis
 Terebratulina kyusyuensis
 Terebratulina meridionalis
 Terebratulina pacifica
 Terebratulina peculiaris
 Terebratulina photina
 Terebratulina radula
 Terebratulina reevei
 Terebratulina retusa
 Terebratulina septentrionalis
 Terebratulina sirahamensis
 Terebratulina unguicula
 Terebratulina valdiviae
 Tethyrhynchia (1 species)
 Tethyrhynchia mediterranea
 Thaumatosia (1 species)
 Thaumatosia anomala
 Thecidellina (12 species)
 Thecidellina bahamiensis
 Thecidellina barretti
 Thecidellina blochmanni
 Thecidellina congregata
 Thecidellina europa
 Thecidellina insolita
 Thecidellina japonica
 Thecidellina maxilla
 Thecidellina meyeri
 Thecidellina williamsi
 Tichosina (19 species)
 Tichosina abrupta
 Tichosina bahamiensis
 Tichosina bartletti
 Tichosina bartschi
 Tichosina bullisi
 Tichosina dubia
 Tichosina elongata
 Tichosina erecta
 Tichosina expansa
 Tichosina floridensis
 Tichosina labiata
 Tichosina martinicensis
 Tichosina obesa
 Tichosina pillsburyae
 Tichosina plicata
 Tichosina rotundovata
 Tichosina solida
 Tichosina subtriangulata
 Tichosina truncata
 Tythothyris (1 species)
 Tythothyris rosimarginata
 Valdiviathyris (1 species)
 Valdiviathyris quenstedti
 Xenobrochus (9 species)
 Xenobrochus africanus
 Xenobrochus agulhasensis
 Xenobrochus anomalus
 Xenobrochus australis
 Xenobrochus indianensis
 Xenobrochus naudei
 Xenobrochus norfolkensis
 Xenobrochus rotundus
 Xenobrochus translucidus
 Zygonaria (2 species)
 Zygonaria davidsoni
 Zygonaria joloensis

See also
List of brachiopod genera
Taxonomy of the Brachiopoda

References

 Species
Lists of species lists
Lists of animal species